Daniele Chiarini (born April 11, 1979 in Bibbiena) is an Italian footballer who plays as a defender for Sangiovannese.

Career
Chiarini began his career in Serie A with Fiorentina but made just one appearance and moved to Udinese in 1997. Chiarini spent part of his first season on loan to Arezzo, making ten appearances, and when he failed to make an Udinese appearance after two years with the club, moved to Montevarchi. A move in 2000 to Faenza followed, where he played over sixty games in two season, netting his first career goal. In 2002, Chiarini moved to Scotland with Partick Thistle and impressed enough in a short-term deal to win a move to Dundee United. After just four games for United, Chiarini fell out of favour with new manager Ian McCall and ended up back at Partick in 2004, where he played six times. The following season, he moved back to Italy with Martina, where he spent a year, followed by a year with former club Arezzo. Chiarini signed for Pisa in 2006.  After a move to Lucchese in 2008, he signed for Sangiovannese in 2009.

References

External links
 FootballPlus stats

1979 births
S.S. Arezzo players
ACF Fiorentina players
Dundee United F.C. players
Italian footballers
Living people
Partick Thistle F.C. players
Pisa S.C. players
Udinese Calcio players
S.S.D. Lucchese 1905 players
Serie A players
Serie B players
Scottish Premier League players
Expatriate footballers in Scotland
Italian expatriate sportspeople in Scotland
Italian expatriate footballers
A.S.D. Martina Calcio 1947 players
Association football defenders